Sison is a genus of flowering plant in the family Apiaceae, native to western and southern Europe and north Africa. The genus was first described by Carl Linnaeus in 1753, in his book Species Plantarum.

Species
, Plants of the World Online accepted the following species:
Sison amomum L.
Sison scaligerioides
Sison exaltatum Boiss.
Sison segetum L.
Sison trinervium

References

Apioideae
Apioideae genera
Taxa named by Carl Linnaeus
Taxa described in 1753